Olha Oleksandrivna Puhovska (born 1 November 1942) is a Ukrainian rower who competed for the Soviet Union in the 1976 Summer Olympics.

In 1976 she was the coxswain of the Soviet boat which won the silver medal in the eights event.

External links
 profile

1942 births
Living people
Russian female rowers
Ukrainian female rowers
Soviet female rowers
Coxswains (rowing)
Olympic rowers of the Soviet Union
Rowers at the 1976 Summer Olympics
Olympic silver medalists for the Soviet Union
Olympic medalists in rowing
Medalists at the 1976 Summer Olympics